Basingwerk Abbey is a Grade I listed ruined abbey near Holywell, Flintshire, Wales. The abbey, which was founded in the 12th century, belonged to the Order of Cistercians. It maintained significant lands in the English county of Derbyshire. The abbey was abandoned and its assets sold following the Dissolution of the Monasteries in 1536.

The site is now managed by Cadw – the national Welsh heritage agency.

Medieval history

The abbey was founded in 1132 by Ranulf de Gernon, 4th Earl of Chester, who had already brought Benedictine monks from Savigny Abbey in southern Normandy. Likely the first location of the abbey was not at the current location at Greenfields but at the nearby Hen Blas. The abbey became part of the Cistercian Order in 1147. It was a daughter house of Combermere Abbey in Cheshire, of which Earl Ranulf was a great benefactor. However, in 1147 the abbot and convent of Savigny transferred it to Buildwas Abbey in Shropshire. Twenty years later, the monks of Basingwerk challenged their subjection to Buildwas, but Savigny found against them and sent a letter notifying their decision to the abbot of Cîteaux, the head of the Cistercian order. An Earl of Chester gave the manor of West Kirby to the Abbey.

In 1157, Owain Gwynedd encamped his army at Basingwerk, though at the Hen Blas site not at the current site, before facing the forces of Henry II at the Battle of Ewloe. The Welsh Prince stopped at the abbey because of its strategic importance. It blocked the route Henry II had to take to reach Twthill, Rhuddlan. In the fighting that followed, Owain Gwynedd split his army routing the English near Ewloe.

The abbey had significant lands in the English county of Derbyshire. Henry II gave the monks a manor near Glossop. The Monks' Road and the Abbot's Chair near the town are a reminder of the Abbey's efforts to administer their possession. In 1290 the Abbey gained a market charter for Glossop. The monks also got another charter for nearby Charlesworth in 1328.

By the 13th century, the abbey was under the patronage of Llywelyn the Great, Prince of Gwynedd. His son Dafydd ap Llywelyn gave St Winefride's Well to the abbey. The monks harnessed the power of the Holywell stream to run a corn mill and to treat the wool from their sheep. In 1433, the monks leased all of Glossopdale in Derbyshire to the Talbot family, the future Earls of Shrewsbury (1442).

A legend says a 12th-century Basingwerk Abbey monk was lured into a nearby wood by the singing of a nightingale. He thought he had only been listening a short while, but when he returned, the abbey was in ruins. He crumbled to dust shortly afterwards.

In 1536, abbey life came to an end with the Dissolution of the Monasteries during the reign of Henry VIII. Its dissolution was made lawful by the Dissolution of the Lesser Monasteries Act and the lands of the abbey were granted to lay owners.

Two centuries earlier a Welsh seer, Robin Ddu ("Robin the Dark"), said the roof on the refectory would go to a church under Moel Famau. It did: when the abbey was sold, the parts of the roof went to St Mary's Church in Cilcain below the slopes of Moel Famau. Another section of roof was reportedly given to the Collegiate and Parochial Church of St Peter at Ruthin, where it still covers the North Nave. Its Jesse window went to the Church of St Dyfnog at Llanrhaeadr-yng-Nghinmeirch.

Present day

The abbey ruins are part of Greenfield Valley Heritage Park, and are managed by Cadw.

The abbey marks the starting point of the North Wales Pilgrims Way.

See also
List of monastic houses in Wales
List of Cadw properties
The Form of Preaching, a 14th-century style book or manual about a preaching style
Holywell Junction railway station

Footnotes

Further reading
 (1st ed. 1986)

External links

Basingwerk Abbey in old books
geograph.co.uk: photos of Basingwerk Abbey and surrounding area today

Ruins in Wales
Cistercian monasteries in Wales
Cadw
1132 establishments in Wales
1536 disestablishments in Wales
Religious organizations established in the 1130s
Christian monasteries established in the 12th century
Tourist attractions in Flintshire
Buildings and structures in Flintshire
Ruined abbeys and monasteries
Grade I listed buildings in Flintshire
Scheduled monuments in Flintshire
Monasteries dissolved under the English Reformation